The Kawęczyn Heat Plant is a coal-fired heat plant at osiedle Kawęczyn in Rembertów district of Warsaw, Poland. It was operated by Vattenfall but their Polish operations were taken over by Polish energy company PGNiG in 2012.

The heat plant has an installed thermal capacity of 512 MW.

See also

 List of towers

References

External links
 www.skyscraperpage.com

Coal-fired power stations in Poland
Buildings and structures in Warsaw
Chimneys in Poland
Rembertów